The Jeti-Ögüz ( or) is a river in Jeti-Ögüz District of Issyk-Kul Region of Kyrgyzstan. It rises on north slopes of Teskey Ala-Too Range and flows into lake Issyk-Kul. Jeti-Ögüz resort and Jeti-Ögüz village are located near the river. Several breakthrough-prone lakes including Telety, Archaly-Ter, Atjailoo and Asantukum located in the basin of the river at altitudes above 3500 m posing a risk of floods.

References

Rivers of Kyrgyzstan
Tributaries of Issyk-Kul